Liam Cormier (born February 9, 1980) is a Canadian musician from Toronto, Ontario. He is the lead singer for Canadian hardcore punk band Cancer Bats. He is also the lead singer for the supergroup AxeWound. He is a vegetarian and lives a straight edge lifestyle. He also runs his own clothing brand called Treadwell Clothing.

Cancer Bats
Liam Cormier is the lead singer for the Canadian hardcore punk band Cancer Bats. The band is composed of Cormier, drummer Mike Peters, and bassist Jaye R. Schwarzer. Cormier has been in the band since 2004. They have released seven studio albums and six extended plays.

AxeWound
Cormier is the lead singer for the supergroup AxeWound. The band started in 2012.  The band consists of Cormier on lead vocals, Matthew Tuck of Bullet for My Valentine on guitar and backing vocals, Mike Kingswood of Glamour of the Kill on guitar, Joe Copcutt of Zoax playing bass and Jason Bowld of Pitchshifter on drums.

Discography
Cancer Bats
Birthing the Giant (2006)
Hail Destroyer (2008)
Bears, Mayors, Scraps & Bones (2010)
Dead Set on Living (2012)
Searching for Zero (2015)
The Spark That Moves (2018)
Psychic Jailbreak (2022)

AxeWound
Vultures

Liam Cormier
Modern Decay (2019)

References

Living people
Canadian punk rock singers
Musicians from Toronto
1980 births
21st-century Canadian male singers
AxeWound members